.ovh is an active generic top-level domain (gTLD) delegated to the DNS root zone on June 20, 2014. The domain is sponsored by OVH, a major French telecommunications and hosting business. This top-level domain is run by the AFNIC and registrations are open to all via OVH, the sole registrar of .ovh domains.

References

External links
IANA — .ovh Domain Delegation Data

ovh